James David Austin is a New Zealand former rugby league footballer who represented New Zealand in the 1954 World Cup.

Playing career
Austin played in the Auckland Rugby League competition and was first selected for the New Zealand national rugby league team in 1954, playing a Test against the touring Great Britain side. He was then included in the New Zealand squad for the 1954 World Cup and played in two matches.

Austin also played for the Auckland side that defeated Great Britain 5–4 at Carlaw Park that year.

References

Living people
Auckland rugby league team players
New Zealand national rugby league team players
New Zealand rugby league players
Rugby league wingers
Year of birth missing (living people)